Keith Thomas is an American film director, screenwriter, producer, and author. He is best known for directing horror films such as The Vigil (2019) and Firestarter (2022).

Career
In 2017, he founded the production company Night Platform and began his career by directing, writing, and producing the horror short film Arkane. In 2019, he directed the supernatural horror feature film The Vigil. In December 2019, Thomas signed on to direct the Stephen King adaptation Firestarter. In September 2021, Thomas was hired to direct an episode on the Netflix series Guillermo del Toro's Cabinet of Curiosities. In February 2022, Thomas directed, wrote, and produced the music video I Disappear (When You're Near), for A Place to Bury Strangers' album, See Through You. In May 2022, Thomas stated that there are ongoing discussions to possibly expand Firestarter into a franchise.

Thomas also wrote the novels The Clarity, Dahlia Black, and The Dunnie.

Filmography
Film

Television

Music video(s)

Bibliography 
 The  Clarity (2018)
 Dahlia Black (2019)
 The Dunnie (2022)

References

External links
 

21st-century American male writers
21st-century American screenwriters
American film directors
American male screenwriters
Horror film directors
Living people
Music video directors
Place of birth missing (living people)
Year of birth missing (living people)